Antoine Dubé (born 15 May 1947) was a member of the House of Commons of Canada from 1993 to 2003. Born in Sainte-Rita, Quebec, Dubé has worked in administration and recreation.

In 1984, he unsuccessfully sought a seat in federal parliament with the Parti nationaliste du Québec.

Dubé was elected in the Lévis electoral district under the Bloc Québécois party in the 1993, 1997 and 2000 elections, serving in the 35th, 36th and 37th Canadian Parliaments respectively. The riding was renamed Lévis-et-Chutes-de-la-Chaudière in 1998, during his second term of federal office.

Dubé left federal office on 17 March 2003 to seek the seat of Chutes-de-la-Chaudière in that year's provincial election with the Parti Québécois, but lost to Marc Picard.

In the 2015 Canadian federal election, Dubé sought election in Bellechasse—Les Etchemins—Lévis as a candidate of the Bloc Québécois. The seat was held by the Conservative Party's Steven Blaney. He finished 4th with 11.53% of the vote behind Blaney, who was re-elected.

Electoral record

References

External links
 

1947 births
Living people
Bloc Québécois MPs
Members of the House of Commons of Canada from Quebec
Parti nationaliste du Québec politicians
People from Lévis, Quebec
21st-century Canadian politicians